Lyndel "Lynn" Warren Newbry (June 22, 1923 – June 28, 2012) was an American politician who was a member of the Oregon State Senate. He served from 1961 to 1974 as a Republican. Newbry is an alumnus of Oregon State University and Pomona College. He served in World War II with the United States Army Air Forces. He was later a fruit farmer and businessman. Newbry died at the age of 89 in 2012.

References

1923 births
2012 deaths
Republican Party Oregon state senators
People from Talent, Oregon
Oregon State University alumni
Pomona College alumni
United States Army Air Forces personnel of World War II
Farmers from Oregon